Maska is a 2009 Indian Telugu-language romantic action comedy film. It was directed by B. Gopal and starred Ram, Hansika Motwani, Sheela, and Sunil. It was released on 14 January 2009 with 300 prints in 550 theaters. It was remade into Bengali (Bangladesh) as Onnorokom Bhalobasha in 2012 for Valentine's Day. It was also remade into Bengali (India-Bangladesh joint venture) as Hero 420 in 2016 for Valentine's Day. The film was dubbed into Hindi as Phool Aur Kante. It turned out to be an Average at the box office.

Plot
Krish (Ram) is a happy-go-lucky guy who lives with his brother (Naresh) and sister-in-law (Jhansi). He was in love with a girl named Manju (Sheela), who happens to be the daughter of Simhachalam (Mukesh Rishi). Krish's only intention is to become rich by marrying her, and he does not have any feelings whatsoever towards her. He weaves a love story between him and a girl called Meenakshi, aka Meenu (Hansika Motwani), to make Manju fall for him. He also meets Meenu, starts to like her for real, and falls in love with her. Meanwhile, Simhachalam and Shinde (Pradeep Rawat) run against each other in a presidential election in Delhi. Shinde is a man of misdeeds and tries to find faults in Simhachalam's personal life so that he can expose him in front of the high command of the party so that his route will be clear to get the party ticket. Shinde comes to learn that Simhachalam has another wife (Seetha) and a daughter who lives in Hyderabad. He sends his men to find them. Unfortunately, Simhachalam fixes Manju and Krish's marriage, but Krish loves Meenu. Manju discovers it and points a gun on Meenu, but she leaves Krish to her and reveals that Meenu is the illegitimate daughter of Simhachalam and the sister of Manju. Simhachalam, Krish, and Shinde arrive. Meenu and Manju emotionally ask their father to forget everything and live happily. He gives up the election to Shinde. Krish then marries Meenu, and Manju lives happily.

Cast

 Ram as Krishna “Krish”
 Hansika Motwani as Meenakshi (Meenu)
 Sheela as Manju
 Sunil as Bhadra, Krish's friend
 Mukesh Rishi as Simhachalam, Meenu and Manju's father
 Seetha as Meenu's mother
 Brahmanandam as Doctor
 Pradeep Rawat as Shinde
 Naresh as Krish's brother
 Jhansi as Krish's sister-in-law
 Paruchuri Venkateswara Rao as Simhachalam's assistant
 Dharmavarapu Subramanyam as Software Company M.D.
 Telangana Shakuntala as Shinde's sister
 M. S. Narayana as Priest
 Venu Madhav
 Krishna Bhagavaan

Soundtrack

The music of Maska was launched at a function organized in song set erected at Rama Naidu studios on the night of 25 December 2008. Dasari launched the audio CD and gave the first unit to D Rama Naidu. D Suresh Babu launched the audiocassette and gave the first unit to the main leads of the film.

Box office
The film collected Rs 2.25 crores on its opening day and Rs.10 crores in its first week in theatres.
This film had one of the biggest openings at that time and the biggest in  Ram's career and Made him as Upcoming Star. As per the sources, it is said that the movie is a one of highest grosser at the box officeof  that Year.

References

External links 
 

2000s Telugu-language films
Telugu films remade in other languages
Films directed by B. Gopal
2009 romantic comedy films
2009 films
Indian romantic comedy films
Indian romantic action films
2000s romantic action films
Films scored by Chakri